Jean Wyllys (born Jean Wyllys de Matos Santos on 10 March 1974 in Alagoinhas, Bahia, Brazil) is a Brazilian lecturer, journalist and politician who rose to fame after winning the fifth season of Big Brother Brasil. He was also notable as being Brazil's second openly gay member of parliament and the first congressman who was a gay-rights activist. He has been compared to Harvey Milk for his work. In 2019, citing death threats, he gave up on his Congress seat.

Life
Wyllys was born in Alagoinhas, in the north-eastern state of Bahia, one of seven children. His mother was a washerwoman and his father a car painter who suffered from alcoholism. Wyllys attended a boarding school which gave him the opportunity to get a better education than the average child in his village. Wyllys later moved to Salvador and completed his degree in journalism at the Federal University of Bahia. He first rose to fame after becoming the finalist in the Brazilian reality television show, Big Brother Brasil in its fifth season in 2005. He was the first openly gay participant in the show, which caused a lot of controversy amongst fans and participants alike. Wyllys described his victory as being of "great political relevance [...] I said I was a homosexual and I still won the programme in a country that is homophobic."

Political career
In 2010 Wyllys was elected a federal MP, representing the Socialism and Freedom party, with an average of 13,000 votes. His election was only possible, considering the number of votes he had in 2010 elections, through the so-called "voto de legenda" (party vote), a constitutional mechanism that allows candidates who don't have a large number of votes to be elected through votes of another highly voted candidate of the same party. In Wyllys's case, the votes of another congressman of Socialism and Liberty Party, Chico Alencar, who was one of the most voted in Rio de Janeiro, helped in his election. Upon occupying a seat in the Brazilian Congress, Wyllys brought his LGBT movement activism to the scene. He started working on his political platform, which was primarily focused on the fight for LGBT rights. In so doing, he ended up confronting prominent Brazilian right-wing figures, such as pastor Silas Malafaia, a famous televangelist and national president of the Assembly of God Churches, and Jair Bolsonaro, a congressman (later elected president) who became Wyllys's nemesis in the Brazilian Congress. Wyllys came to the point of spitting at congressman Bolsonaro during the voting of President Dilma Rousseff's impeachment. In Congress, Wyllys proposed three controversial pieces of legislation, including the regulation of prostitution, the legalization and government regulation of marijuana production, and the government financing of sex reassignment surgeries and hormonal treatment for transgender teenagers and adults.

Wyllys' defense of minority rights and his very existence as an openly gay congress member and human rights activist have made him a public enemy of conservative political forces in Brazil. Living in a country with such a high rate of homophobic crimes as Brazil, Wyllys began to receive death threats. These became more recurrent after his political enemies began a slanderous campaign against him by posting and sharing in social media, including Facebook, images with quotes attributed to him, portraying him as being openly a paedophile. Among other false remarks attributed to him was one which stated that the Bible was "a joke" and that Christians and Bible followers were "clowns". This was widely circulated. Nevertheless, people in social networks still shared them, strengthening the ongoing hate campaign against Wyllys. To repair his image damaged by the orchestrated campaign, he created a section on his official webpage where he refutes all the quotes attributed to him. Although his political image in the public sphere had been tarnished by the slanderous campaign, Wyllys ran for congress once again in 2014 and kept his seat in parliament with more than 100,000 votes, being the seventh most voted-for representative from Rio de Janeiro.

In 2015, it was announced that Brazilian independent filmmakers were planning to produce a documentary about Wyllys's political career and activism. The documentary was released in 2016 with the title "Entre os Homens de Bem" (Among Virtuous Men). The documentary focuses on the political arena in Brazil and addresses topics such as gay marriage and LGBT rights, and features Wyllys and his conservative opponents. In that same year, Wyllys was included in the "Top 50 global personalities with an outstanding commitment to diversity" list.

Resignation 
Wyllys was re-elected to a third term as deputy in the 2018 election. However, the campaign took a toll on him. His close friend, Rio de Janeiro city councillor Marielle Franco, was fatally shot in March 2018. In January 2019, just days before the February 1 swearing-in of the 56th Congress, Wyllys released a note from overseas stating that he would not return to Brazil due to alleged death threats and that he would not assume his position as congressman. He told the Folha de São Paulo newspaper that he did not want to live four years under close security watch. His replacement in the Chamber of Deputies will be David Miranda. Soon after news of Wyllys' resignation broke, President Bolsonaro reacted on Twitter, by posting the phrasis "Great day" followed by a "thumbs-up" emoji. His son, Carlos Bolsonaro, also tweeted: "Go with God and be happy".

Notes

References

1974 births
Living people
Big Brother (franchise) winners
Gay politicians
Brazilian LGBT journalists
LGBT legislators
Brazilian LGBT politicians
Brazilian LGBT rights activists
Members of the Chamber of Deputies (Brazil) from Rio de Janeiro (state)
People from Alagoinhas
Socialism and Liberty Party politicians
Workers' Party (Brazil) politicians
Exiled politicians
Brazilian exiles
Big Brother (franchise) contestants
Big Brother Brasil